Lac de Chambly is a lake in the Jura department of France.

Chambly